Maurice Boutel (30 July 1923, at Maghnia in Algeria - 5 January 2003 in Saint-Denis, Seine-Saint-Denis) was a French film director, screenwriter and dialoguist.

Filmography 

Director 
 1951 :  The Case of Doctor Galloy  (under his real name Maurice Téboul)
 1951 : Monsieur Octave
 1959 : Vice Squad 
 1960 : Interpol Against X
 1960 : Business 
 1960 : First Criminal Brigade 
 1963 : Prostitution 
 1964 : On Murder Considered as One of the Fine Arts 
 1966 : The Man from Interpol

References

External links 

1923 births
2003 deaths
People from Maghnia
People of French Algeria
Pieds-Noirs
French film directors
French screenwriters
20th-century French screenwriters